Magna College of Engineering is an engineering school in Chennai, India established in 1999. It offers undergraduate degrees and is affiliated to Anna University, Chennai.

References

External links 

Engineering colleges in Chennai